Salaan Mahamud Hirsi (1864 – 1943), better known as Salaan Carrabey, was a famous poet from the Adan Madoba sub-division of the Habr Je'lo Isaaq clan.

Poetry
Salaan's poetry is very rich and he was a notable figure and participant in the most famous chain of Somali poetry known as the Guba series in which legendary Isaaq and Darood poets traded boastful and sharp verses. Somali scholar and linguist Musa Haji Ismail Galal recorded many of his works.

Mayn
Salaan had left Burao for several months after and upon his return the locals asked him to recite something. His response was this poem Mine

War Toolow Colka Jooja
Heavy infighting broke out between the Ahmed Farah and Rer Dahir subclans, both belonging to the wider Nuux subclan of the Habr Je'lo. The conflict had been going on for a long time, and no one had been able to put an end to it. Finally, the two subclans resolved to settle the dispute by battle, as is customary among Somalis. As the warriors gathered on the battleground, a famous and respected Sheikh named Fiqi Hasan, walked between them, reading from the Qu'ran while simultaneously translating verses from it for his audience, to remind them of the devastating results of conflict between relatives, as well as reminding the warring parties of their duties in Islam. One of the men responded by striking the Qur'an out of Hasan's hands and Salaan stepped forward telling the Sheikh that he spoke a language that these men understood (poetry). He then proceeded to recite a now-famous poem of his in geeraar style, titled War Toolow Colka Jooja (Oh Clansmen, Stop the War, or Oh! Kinsmen Stop the War): 

After Salaan concluded the geeraar Oh Clansmen, Stop the War, one of the intermediary elders, Baashe Shabeelle, told him that what he had just recited was not a gabay, and told him to recite something among the men or leave the battlefield. In response, Salaan then composed the famous poem, Kinship is a Shelter:

It was said that when Salaan Carrabay had finished the poem that the two enemies, impressed by their kinsman’s appeal, disengaged and went their separate ways, avoiding further bloodshed.

Haadaaqsi
Following a string of Habr Je'lo victories over the Dhulbahante in which they had captured many wells and reduced their opponents to a pitiful state, Salaan Carrabey composed this boastful poem called Haadaaqsi. The most important victory was the capture of the famous well of Caynabo. Hadaaqsi forms part of the Guba series.

Tolnimo Wa Dugsiye
Carrabey in his poem Tolnimo Wa Dugsiye (Kinship is a Shelter) notes many internal conflicts some of the decades prior and others that were ongoing. He preaches that kinship is in fact a bond and source of strength that should be valued. One such conflict he notes was fighting between kindred sections of the Habr Yunis. The powerful Sultan Hersi Aman caused much devastation when he attempted to become even more absolutist, eventually dying at the hands of his own clan in battle.

See also
Musa Haji Ismail Galal
Kite Fiqi
Farah Nur
Cali Dhuux
Hersi Aman
Hussein Hasan

References

19th-century Somalian people
20th-century Somalian people
20th-century poets
19th-century poets
Somaliland poets
1864 births
1943 deaths